Cahit Önel (23 November 1927 – 17 September 1970) was a Turkish middle distance runner who competed in the 1948 Summer Olympics, in the 1952 Summer Olympics, in the 1960 Summer Olympics, and in the 1964 Summer Olympics.

References

1927 births
1970 deaths
Turkish male middle-distance runners
Olympic athletes of Turkey
Athletes (track and field) at the 1948 Summer Olympics
Athletes (track and field) at the 1952 Summer Olympics
Athletes (track and field) at the 1960 Summer Olympics
Athletes (track and field) at the 1964 Summer Olympics
Mediterranean Games medalists in athletics
Mediterranean Games silver medalists for Turkey
Mediterranean Games bronze medalists for Turkey
Athletes (track and field) at the 1951 Mediterranean Games
Athletes (track and field) at the 1955 Mediterranean Games
20th-century Turkish people